Soeda may refer to:

People
 Go Soeda (born 1984), Japanese tennis player
 Takashi Soedaborn 1993), Japanese football player

Places
 Soeda, Fukuoka, Japan